Reflections at Keppel Bay in Singapore is luxury waterfront residential complex on approx 84,000 m² of land with 750m of shoreline. It was completed in 2011, offering 1129 units with a 99-year leasehold. The six distinctive curved glass towers afford panorama views of Mount Faber and Sentosa.

The complex was designed by Daniel Libeskind, who is known for creating the World Trade Center Memorial masterplan. The local architect was DCA Architects.

Location

Reflections at Keppel Bay is located on Keppel Bay View, off Telok Blangah Road. Neighbouring condominiums are Caribbean at Keppel Bay and Corals at Keppel Bay. The nearest MRT station to the complex is Telok Blangah MRT station, while also within walking distance to the shopping malls HarbourFront Centre and VivoCity. A free shuttle bus for residents to VivoCity which runs at 30-minute intervals, or 15 minutes at peak hours.

Awards

Reflections at Keppel Bay won the FIABCI Prix D’Excellence Awards (Residential High-Rise) in 2013 and The Chicago Athenaeum International Architecture Award in 2012.

Locally, it won the BCA Universal Design Mark Platinum Award in 2013  in recognition of the accessibility features of the condominium, which was highly usable by older people, people without disabilities, and people with disabilities.

References

External links
 Reflections at Keppel Bay brochure
 Reflections at Keppel Bay on Daniel Liebeskind Official Website
 More about Reflections at Keppel Bay
 Reflections at Keppel Bay Condo

Gallery

Deconstructivism
Tourist attractions in Singapore
Daniel Libeskind buildings
Residential buildings completed in 2011
2011 establishments in Singapore
Residential skyscrapers in Singapore